This is the list of cathedrals in Denmark sorted by denomination.

Lutheran
Cathedrals of the Danish National Church:
 St. Budolfi Cathedral in Aalborg
 Aarhus Cathedral in Århus
 Cathedral of Our Lady in Copenhagen
 Haderslev Cathedral in Haderslev
 Maribo Cathedral in Maribo
 St. Canute's Cathedral in Odense
 Cathedral of Our Lady Mary in Ribe
 Roskilde Cathedral in Roskilde
 Our Lady Cathedral in Viborg
 Saint Olaf's Cathedral in Helsingør
 Cathedral of Our Saviour in Nuuk, Greenland

Roman Catholic

Cathedrals of the Roman Catholic church in Denmark:
 St. Ansgar's Cathedral in Copenhagen

See also

List of cathedrals
Christianity in Denmark

References

Cathedrals in Denmark
Denmark
Cathedrals
Cathedrals